HMS Phoebe (F42) was a  frigate of the Royal Navy (RN).  She was, like the rest of her class, named after a figure of mythology. Built by Alexander Stephen and Sons on the River Clyde, she was launched on 19 December 1964 and commissioned on 15 May 1966.

Construction and description
Phoebe was ordered during 1962 as one of the first Batch 2 Leander-class frigates. The ship was laid down at Alexander Stephen and Sons Linthouse, Glasgow shipyard on 25 July 1963, was launched on 19 December 1964 and completed on 14 May 1966. She commissioned with the pennant number F42 on 15 May 1966.

Displacement was  standard and  full load. The ship was fitted with Y-136 machinery, built by Cammell Laird.

A twin 4.5-inch (113 mm) Mark 6 gun mount was fitted forward. Anti-aircraft defence was provided by a quadruple Sea Cat surface-to-air missile launcher on the hangar roof, while two Oerlikon 20 mm cannon for close-in defence against surface targets.  A Limbo anti-submarine mortar was fitted aft to provide a short-range anti-submarine capability, while a hangar and helicopter deck allowed a single Westland Wasp helicopter to be operated, for longer range anti-submarine and anti-surface operations.

As built, Phoebe was fitted with a large Type 965 long range air search radar on the ship's mainmast, with a Type 993 short range air/surface target indicating radar and Type 974 navigation radar carried on the ship's foremast. An MRS3 fire control system was carried over the ship's bridge to direct the 4.5-inch guns, while a GWS22 director for Seacat was mounted on the hangar roof. The ship had a sonar suite of Type 177 medium range search sonar, Type 162 bottom search and Type 170 attack sonar, together with a Type 199 variable depth sonar (VDS).

Operational service
In the year of her commission, Phoebe assisted in the emotionally charged withdrawal from Aden in 1967. In 1969, Phoebe took part in the 20th Anniversary of NATO Fleet Review held at Spithead.

In February 1970, Phoebe undertook a 10-month overseas deployment, which included three assignments to the Beira Patrol off Mozambique in an attempt to stop the supply of oil to Rhodesia in contravention of an oil embargo. In April 1970, Phoebe left her Mozambique patrol to assist in the Indian Ocean as part of an Apollo 13 splashdown secondary task force. In 1971, Phoebe deployed to the West Indies.  That same year, Phoebe was guard ship during talks between British Prime Minister Edward Heath and U.S. President Richard Nixon. She suffered minor damage when the frigate  collided with her whilst attempting to leave Portsmouth Harbour during the first week in November 1971. In 1973, Phoebe took part in the Second Cod War, during the fishing disputes with Iceland.
 
Between 1973 and 1977 Phoebe was used for the filming of the popular Warship BBC drama, set on board the fictional HMS Hero.

In 1974, Phoebe commenced her modernisation, which including altering her weapons configuration.  Her single 4.5-inch twin turret was removed in favour of the Exocet anti-ship missile system, giving her a powerful anti-surface capability. The number of SeaCat missiles she carried was increased.  The modernisation was completed in 1977.  She subsequently took part in the Silver Jubilee celebrations and Fleet Review, at which many warships attended from a variety of nations.

In 1978, Phoebe patrolled in the Caribbean and subsequently joined Standing Naval Force Atlantic (STANAVFORLANT), a multi-national squadron of NATO in company with USS Pharris, the German frigate Emden, HMCS Okanagan and the Dutch frigate Tjerk Hiddes.  In that year, Phoebe had the distinction of becoming the first frigate to operate the Westland Lynx attack helicopter aka 'Phelix', which remains in service, though obviously of a newer variant.In February 1981, Phoebe was refitted with Towed array sonar type 2031.

In September 1982, Phoebe deployed to the South Atlantic in the aftermath of the Falklands War, and performed a number of duties, though mainly patrolling in that region.  In 1984, Phoebe completed her towed array sonar refit.  In 1988, Phoebe again served under Standing Naval Force Atlantic and took part in the rescue effort in the tragic aftermath of the Piper Alpha oil rig explosion in the North Sea, which killed 167 people.  Phoebe decommissioned in 1991 and was sold for scrap the following year. Some of her notable Commanding Officers include P E C Berger, G I Pritchard, Hugh Balfour and Jonathon Band.

References

Publications

External links
 Royal Navy leaflet on Warship, from the HMS Phoebe Association website
 Comments on Warship by series Director Michael Briant
 Webpage (at Home > Scriptwriting > Warship) about Michael J Bird's scripts for Warship
 HMS Phoebe Association website

Leander-class frigates
Ships built on the River Tyne
1964 ships